Ross Caldwell (born 26 October 1993) is a Scottish footballer who plays as a midfielder or striker for Darvel.

Caldwell has previously played for Hibernian, Alloa Athletic, St Mirren, Greenock Morton, Ayr United, Cowdenbeath, Brechin City, and Blantyre Victoria.

Career
Caldwell, who was educated at Hamilton Grammar School, started playing football relatively late in childhood. He played for various boys teams before joining the youth system of Edinburgh professional club Hibernian (Hibs). Hibs manager Pat Fenlon added Caldwell to the first team squad soon after he took charge in November 2011. Caldwell was named as a substitute in a game against Motherwell, but was prevented from playing because the match was abandoned. He made his senior debut on 10 December 2011, appearing as a substitute in a 2–0 defeat against Rangers. Caldwell agreed a new two-year contract with Hibs in March 2012.

Caldwell was mainly used as a substitute during the 2012–13 season. In his second starting appearance for Hibs, he scored a match-winning goal against Hearts at Tynecastle on 12 May 2013. He made seven first team appearances in the early months of the 2013–14 season, but did not play for Hibs after 30 November. Caldwell was loaned to Alloa Athletic in January 2014 for the rest of the season. He scored a goal in his first appearance for Alloa, in a 3–1 defeat against Queen of the South.

Caldwell went on trial with St Mirren in July 2014 and subsequently signed a one-year contract with the club, with the option of a second year. After limited appearances for the club, Caldwell terminated his contract by mutual consent on 9 January 2015. In his time at the club, Caldwell made 15 appearances, scoring two goals.

On the same day Caldwell left St Mirren, he signed a contract with Scottish League One side Greenock Morton until the end of season 2014–15. He was released by Morton at the end of the season. In July 2015, Caldwell signed for Ayr United on a six-month deal. At the start of January 2016, Caldwell was released by Ayr United having made 22 appearances, scoring five times for the side. He subsequently signed for league rivals Cowdenbeath shortly after his released from Ayr. Caldwell left Central Park and just four months, signing for Brechin City in June 2016. Caldwell was released by the club on 30 May 2017, after one season at Glebe Park.

On 3 October 2020, Caldwell announced that he had joined West of Scotland Football League side Darvel ahead of the upcoming season.

International
Caldwell was invited to a training camp of the Scotland national under-19 football team in March 2011.

Career statistics

Honours
Morton
Scottish League One: Winners 2014–15

References

External links

1993 births
Living people
Footballers from Bellshill
Scottish footballers
Association football forwards
Scottish Premier League players
Hibernian F.C. players
People educated at Hamilton Grammar School
Scottish Professional Football League players
Alloa Athletic F.C. players
St Mirren F.C. players
Greenock Morton F.C. players
West of Scotland Football League players
Ayr United F.C. players
Cowdenbeath F.C. players
Brechin City F.C. players